The 21st Trampoline World Championships were held in Sun City, South Africa from 30 September to 3 October 1999.

Results

Men

Trampoline Individual

Trampoline Team

Trampoline Synchro

Double Mini Trampoline

Double Mini Trampoline Team

Tumbling

Tumbling Team

Women

Trampoline Individual

Trampoline Team

Trampoline Synchro

Double Mini Trampoline

Double Mini Trampoline Team

Tumbling

Tumbling Team

References 

 Trampoline UK

Trampoline World Championships
Trampoline Gymnastics World Championships
Trampoline World Championships
Trampoline